Stalemate is the debut studio album of SMP, released in May 1995 by Re-Constriction Records.

Reception

John Bush of allmusic gave the Stalemate three out of five stars and favorably compared the music to My Life with the Thrill Kill Kult. Sonic Boom credited the duo with surpassing their contemporaries in meshing music styles, saying "the number of musicians that try to create music with this radical mixing of styles are few and far between [and] SMP outshine their brethren with a practiced ease." Aiding & Abetting also wrote positively of the album, saying "it may take a couple moments to really tap into what SMP is doing, but the sonic explosion in your mind will be well worth the effort." Trubie Turner of ReGen said the album captures the band at their "raw and intense best" and called Stalemate "bristling with attitude and a unique infusion of hip-hop style with subtle punk overtones."

Track listing

Personnel
Adapted from the Stalemate liner notes.

SMP
 Jason Bazinet – lead vocals, mixing
 Sean Setterberg (as Sean Ivy) – mixing

Production and design
 A.P. Boone – production, engineering, mixing
 Tim Farrow – turntables, production, engineering, mixing
 Charles Holzer – engineering
 Corinna Nye – photography
 Eric Powell – cover art, design

Release history

References

External links 
 Stalemate at iTunes
 

1995 debut albums
SMP (band) albums
Re-Constriction Records albums